Regina Coeli Church is a Roman Catholic church that was founded in 1862 in Hyde Park, NY. It includes St. Paul's mission chapel in Staatsburg, New York.

History
The first church to bear the name in Hyde Park was constructed in 1863. The English Gothic brick structure was donated by Mrs. Mortimer Livingston and her daughter, Mrs. Sylvia Livingston Drayton Kirkpatrick. 

The Rev. Tobias M. Fitzpatrick was the first resident priest. His successors were:
 Rev. John Parker 1883
 Rev. Michael Murray 1884
 Rev. Fr. Leahy 1888
 Rev. Terence F. Kelly 1890 
 Rev. R.J. Burns 1898
 Rev. John De La Poer Lonargan 

Later a large church was constructed near the original foundation, which can still be seen today. The current church building, dedicated in 1966, is on U.S. Route 9, also referred to as Albany Post Road.

Parish School
Found in 1955, the parish elementary school contained grades Pre-K through eight, and currently has about 220 enrolled students. The original building has been expanded once, adding a two-story wing to the back with 8 additional classrooms, in the 1970s. Regina Coeli Elementary School closed in 2015.

References

External links
Parish Website
School Website

Regina Coeli
Regina Coeli
Buildings and structures in Hyde Park, New York
Religious organizations established in 1862
Roman Catholic churches completed in 1862
1862 establishments in New York (state)
19th-century Roman Catholic church buildings in the United States
Churches in Dutchess County, New York